Maxence Flachez (born 5 August 1972) is a French former professional footballer who played as a central defender, and is a manager.

Football career
Born in Grenoble, Flachez made his professional – and Ligue 1 – debut for Olympique Lyonnais on 29 August 1992 (aged 20), in a 2–2 home draw against Olympique de Marseille. Ironically, after gaining more experience he appeared less for the first team, eventually leaving in the summer of 1995.

After one year in FC Martigues, Flachez joined FC Sochaux-Montbéliard, where he would remain for eight straight seasons always as an undisputed starter (four years apiece in the top flight and Ligue 2), playing more than 300 competitive matches. In 2002–03 he helped the team finish fifth and reach the final of the Coupe de la Ligue; as the latter competition winners AS Monaco FC ranked second in the league and qualified for the UEFA Champions League, Sochaux qualified for the UEFA Cup, where the player took part in his first matches (six).

Flachez spent one more campaign in the second division with En Avant de Guingamp, then switched to another side in that level, Valenciennes FC, which he helped promote immediately as champions. A final promotion to the top tier was achieved in 2007–08, with hometown's Grenoble Foot 38; after their subsequent relegation, he retired from football at nearly 37 and returned to first professional club Lyon, as a TV pundit for the official channel.

Coaching career
Flachez started working as a manager in 2015, going on to spend four years at Lyon in charge of the under-19 side as well as the reserves.

On 10 January 2018, Flachez was appointed assistant manager of Canadian club Montreal Impact under manager Rémi Garde.

In July 2019 it was confirmed, that Flanchez would be the assistant manager of Philippe Anziani for the B-team of Olympique de Marseille.

Honours
Sochaux
Ligue 2: 2000–01
Coupe de la Ligue: 2003–04; runners-up 2002–03

Valenciennes
Ligue 2: 2005–06

References

External links

1972 births
Living people
Sportspeople from Grenoble
French footballers
Association football defenders
Ligue 1 players
Ligue 2 players
Olympique Lyonnais players
FC Martigues players
FC Sochaux-Montbéliard players
En Avant Guingamp players
Valenciennes FC players
Grenoble Foot 38 players
France under-21 international footballers
Competitors at the 1993 Mediterranean Games
Mediterranean Games bronze medalists for France
Mediterranean Games medalists in football
Footballers from Auvergne-Rhône-Alpes